Collela Mazee (real name Richard Owino Osalla) was a Kenyan musician, who was a leading member of the Victoria Jazz band alongside Ochieng Nelly. They were among the originators of benga music, a music genre with origins in Kenya's Luoland.

History

Early years
Born in 1954 in Gem, Siaya District Collela attended Ngere High School where he was introduced to music in the school band. By the time he was through with education, Collela had a basic knowledge of music. Near his father's house, there lived a guitar-player and after school, together with others, he usually went to his place and watched him play. That is how he developed an interest in the guitar. He was still a child and his parents like others, did not want him to become involved in music. The risk of being found out was high and the punishment heavy. When his parents and parents of his friends caught them, they were beaten severely. They built their own little guitars, which they strummed on the way back from school. When they came near home, they hid them. That is how they learnt the guitar. “We couldn't help doing it, it was in our blood," said Collela.

Victoria Jazz
On leaving school in 1971, Collela joined the then Victoria Jazz. In the same year, with Ochieng' Nelly Mengo (Dr Nelly), they released their first record with AIT produced by Phares Oluoch Kanindo. Ochieng Nelly Mengo was born in Nyanza in 1950 and developed interest in music while still at school. He began to play a home-made guitar when he was very young. He played for and danced with his school friends. Things went on like that until he left school in 1966, and continued playing in the village until 1969 when he joined George Peter's band. In 1970, he joined the late George Ramogi (the leading figure in Luo music), but left him the same year. In December 1970, they founded Victoria Jazz.

The association between Dr Nelly and Collela lasted for only one year before they split up, with the musicians going different ways. Only three members - Opiyo Emma, Okeyo Achayo and Collela - remained and the band had to start again from scratch. It was not until two years later that the band regained its footing and continued recording with AIT. In 1976, they switched to EMI. Recordings at AIT were on the Sungura, and later, Lolwe labels. Dr Nelly founded his own band, Tausi, and own label, Hundhwe, with Kericho's Chandarana Records. After the collapse of EMI, Kanindo started his own POK Music Stores but at the back of their minds, they were thinking of starting their own label because of the tribulations they had suffered while recording on other people's labels.

Dr Nelly's return in 1976/77 did not last and again Victoria Kings split into A and B because some musicians did not believe in starting their own recording company, which they viewed as a source of more problems. Collela asked those who believed in the idea to join him and in 1979 Oula Records was formed. "Oula" means the spontaneous flow of water, the streams that form after the rain. “Oula will always flow. Meaning: Whether people like it or not, we will continue playing the music” Collela said in late 1990s.

More problems were to come as the band split further and Victoria C led by Awino Lawi was formed. The success of Victoria Jazz in the 1970s overshadowed other musicians like Festo Ochuka, Ojwang' Ogara and Keri Were who actually introduced the benga beat. Before benga, rumba, twist and chachacha were very popular. Benga is versatile and can turn into twist, rumba, and into any other music beats. Everything can turn into benga.

The benga style - its rhythms - has a certain sweetness which comes from the bass and solo guitars. It is a flavor people like. When you hear benga, you cannot help but dance. Dr Nelly explained that benga was infectious because it is the thoughts that enter the dancers when they dance to benga. It is really a traditional Luo concept even though other people may now like it. It is a word in Dholuo. “When you dance, you get back down like this, you get up, move like this - that is the meaning of benga”, Dr Nelly once explained to a reporter.

Asked why benga practitioners play love songs all the time, Collela said: "We realized that it is really love songs that sell, which is why we play many of them."

Death
Collela Mazee died in the evening of Tuesday 7 March 2000 at Masaba Hospital in Nairobi, Kenya after being admitted to the hospital on the 4th Saturday suffering from cardio-pulmonary arrest. The musician left three widows, Hellen, Janet Aloo and Betty, and 15 children and 6 grand children. Benga lovers remember Collela for his platinum Dholuo hit songs Jack Jack (1974), Hellena Nyaduse (1976) and his high-riding hit, Solea (2000) among others.

"Dr Nelly", Ochieng' died on Wednesday 30 May 2014 at his rural Kabondo home, Rachuonyo District, after an illustrious entertainment career spanning several decades. He is remembered with some of his best numbers including Sabina, OndiekChilo and Piny Luorore.

References
Retracing the Benga Rhythm, Ketebul Music

current residence before death,Migori county

Kenyan musicians
1954 births
2000 deaths
People from Siaya County